Samuel Purviance House, also known as Nazarene Annex, is a historic home located at Huntington, Huntington County, Indiana.  It was built in 1859, and is a two-story, five bay, Italianate style brick dwelling with a -story rear ell.  It sits on a cut stone foundation and has a flat roof.  The front facade features an entrance portico with Gothic style columns. The house was purchased by the Church of the Nazarene in 1960.

It was listed on the National Register of Historic Places in 1986. It is located in the Drover Town Historic District.

References

Houses on the National Register of Historic Places in Indiana
Italianate architecture in Indiana
Houses completed in 1859
Houses in Huntington County, Indiana
National Register of Historic Places in Huntington County, Indiana
Historic district contributing properties in Indiana